Moon Over Las Vegas is a 1944 American musical comedy film directed by Jean Yarbrough and starring Anne Gwynne, David Bruce and Barbara Jo Allen.

Plot

Beautiful wife Marion Corbett (Anne Gwynne) heads for Las Vegas hoping to make her husband Richard (David Bruce) jealous. But problems arise when another man catches her fancy, and she gets involved.

Cast
 Anne Gwynne as Marion Corbett 
 David Bruce as Richard Corbett 
 Barbara Jo Allen as Auntie 
 Vivian Austin as Grace Towers 
 Alan Dinehart as Hal Blake 
 Lee Patrick as Mrs. Blake 
 Joe Sawyer as Joe 
 Milburn Stone as Jim Bradley 
 Gene Austin as Singer Gene Austin 
 Doris Sherrell as Singer Doris Sherrell 
 Grace Sherrell as Singer Grace Sherrel 
 Connie Haines as Singer Connie Haines 
 Capella & Patriciaas Dance Team 
 Lillian Cornell as Singer 
 Anne Triola as Accordion Player
 Jimmie Dodd as Singer
 The Sportsmen Quartet as Singing Group
 Addison Richards as Judge 
 Mantan Moreland as Porter 
 Eddie Dunn as Conductor 
 Tom Dugan as Herman 
 Pat West as Taxi Driver 
 Muni Seroff as Waiter

References

Bibliography
 John Russell Taylor & Arthur Jackson. The Hollywood Musical. McGraw-Hill Book Co., 1971.

External links
 

1944 films
1944 musical comedy films
American musical comedy films
Universal Pictures films
Films directed by Jean Yarbrough
American black-and-white films
1940s English-language films
1940s American films